Lorenzo Dow Immell (June 18, 1837 – October 31, 1912) was a Union Army soldier in the American Civil War who received the U.S. military's highest decoration, the Medal of Honor.

Immell was born in Ross, Ohio, and joined the army from Fort Leavenworth, Kansas in August 1860. He was awarded the Medal of Honor, for extraordinary heroism shown at Wilson's Creek, Missouri, for bravery in action during the Battle of Wilson's Creek, while serving as a Corporal with Company F, 2nd U.S. Artillery. He was discharged in February 1862. His Medal of Honor was issued on July 19, 1890.

Immell died at the age of 75, on October 31, 1912 and was buried in Jefferson Barracks National Cemetery, in Lemay, St. Louis, Missouri.

Medal of Honor citation

See also

List of American Civil War Medal of Honor recipients: G–L

References

External links

1837 births
1912 deaths
American Civil War recipients of the Medal of Honor
People from Ross, Ohio
Union Army officers
United States Army Medal of Honor recipients